Sławice  (German Slawitz) is a village in the administrative district of Gmina Dąbrowa, within Opole County, Opole Voivodeship, in south-western Poland.

Between 1871 and 1945, the area was part of Germany (see Territorial changes of Poland after World War II).

References

Villages in Opole County